The Education Commission of the States (ECS) is a United States interstate agency that tracks educational policy, translates research, provides advice and "creates opportunities for state policymakers to learn from one another". ECS was founded as a result of the creation of the Compact for Education, an interstate compact approved by Congress and works with all 50 U.S. states, three territories (American Samoa, Guam and Northern Mariana Islands) and the District of Columbia.

The idea of establishing a compact on education and creating an operational arm to follow up on its goals was originally proposed by James Bryant Conant, president of Harvard University. Between 1965 and 1967, John W. Gardner, president of the Carnegie Corporation of New York and former North Carolina Governor Terry Sanford took up the idea, drafted the proposed Compact, obtained the endorsement of all 50 states and got Congress' approval.

The organization opened its offices in Denver in 1967 and began administering the National Assessment of Educational Progress (NAEP) test until the Reagan administration in 1982 made the decision to privatize the test, which is now administered by the Educational Testing Service (ETS). That decision threatened the very existence of the Commission, leading to the virtual closing of ECS's Information Clearinghouse, the laying off or early retirement of half of its 117-member staff and a 50% cut in the organization's budget.

Each member jurisdiction (state, territory, and the District of Columbia) has seven seats on the Commission, including the governor and six appointed members, usually including members of the state legislature and education officials, such as the state education commissioner or head of the state education agency.

Commission chairs
The commissioner chairman ship is held by the governor of a member jurisdiction. The term changed from one year to two years in 2002. It alternates between political parties.

Commission executive directors/presidents

References

Sources
Official website

Education government agencies of the United States
United States interstate agencies